Austin Edison Thomas (25 March 1939 – 15 May 2018) was an Aruban fencer. He competed in the individual foil and épée events at the 1988 Summer Olympics.

References

External links
 

1939 births
2018 deaths
Aruban male fencers
Olympic fencers of Aruba
Fencers at the 1988 Summer Olympics